Auca is a genus of butterflies from the subfamily Satyrinae in the family Nymphalidae. The species in the genus Auca occur in Chile and Argentina and are common throughout the south-temperate region.

References

Satyrini
Butterfly genera